John William Bates (May 28, 1868 – March 24, 1919) was a Major League Baseball pitcher. He played in one game, on August 25, 1889, for the  Kansas City Cowboys of the American Association. He started the game and pitched an eight inning complete game, allowing 12 earned runs and recording the loss. After his brief time with the Cowboys, he played for another two years with the Austin Senators in the Texas League.

Sources

Major League Baseball pitchers
Kansas City Cowboys players
Baseball players from Ohio
1868 births
1919 deaths
19th-century baseball players
Galveston Giants players
Austin Senators players